"Always a Winner" is a song recorded by Australian singer-songwriter Pete Murray. It was released in June 2011 as the lead single from Murray's fifth studio album, Blue Sky Blue. "Always a Winner" peaked at number 38 on the ARIA Singles Chart and was certified gold.

Track listing
 "Always a Winner" - 4:11

Charts

Weekly charts

Year-end charts

Certifications

Release history

References
 

2011 singles
2011 songs
Pete Murray (Australian singer-songwriter) songs
Sony Music Australia singles
Songs written by Pete Murray (Australian singer-songwriter)